The province of Matera is a province in the Basilicata region of Italy. Its capital is the city of Matera. There are 31 comunes (Italian: comuni) in the province (see Comunes of the Province of Matera). The province of Matera is bordered by the province of Potenza in the west and south, the region of Calabria also to the south, the region of Apulia to the east and north, and by the Ionian Sea to the southeast.

The history of settlement in the region dates back to the Palaeolithic Period and the first instance of organised settlement was in 251 BCE, when Roman Republic consul Lucius Caecilius Metellus founded the town as Matera. Matera was sacked multiple times; initially by the Franks, then by Roman Emperor Louis II of Italy, and then by invading Muslims during the 10th century. Following this, the town was owned by the Capetian House of Anjou and the Crown of Aragon and was sold multiple times to successive wealthy families.

Giovanni Carlo Tramontano, Count of Matera was briefly leader of the city but was despised by the residents, who saw him as tyrannical and rebelled against him, murdering Tramontano on 29 December 1514. The city Matera was announced to be the capital of ancient district Lucania (Basilicata) in 1663; this status was removed from the city in 1806 and 1860. Under the Fascist rule of Italy, the title of Matera serving as the capital of Basilicata was restored in 1927. The province is known for its history of "cave dwellings" known as sassi.

Communes
The main comunes by population are :

Montescaglioso hosts the Territorial abbacy of Saint Michael the Archangel, which belongs to the Benedictines.

References

External links
Official website 
Documentary Film about the Sassi di Matera, Roba Forestiera, 44 min., 2004
Sassi di Matera PHOTO TOUR

 
Matera